Carpal articulations may refer to the following in the wrist:

 Carpometacarpal joint
 Intercarpal joints